A cis-Neptunian object is, literally, any astronomical body found within the orbit of Neptune. However, the term is typically used for those distant minor planets other than trans-Neptunian objects: that is, all sub-planetary bodies orbiting the Sun at or within the distance of Neptune, but outside the orbit of Jupiter. This includes the icy minor planets known as centaurs and the Neptune trojans.

Notes

References 

Distant minor planets